Becher Point is the southernmost point of Warnbro Sound in Port Kennedy in Western Australia. It was the site of multiple ship beachings. It is a reference point for the adjacent Ramsar Becher Point Wetlands that lie inland from the point. It offers significant conservation value. It has been identified as a site for assessing Holocene environment on the coastline. As a place name, Port Kennedy is the name of a locality that is found where Becher point is, however Port Kennedy is not a notable coastal feature.

Notes

Headlands of Western Australia
Warnbro Sound